Great Britain competed at the 2016 Winter Youth Olympics in Lillehammer, Norway from 12 to 21 February 2016.

Medalists

Medalists in mixed NOCs events

Alpine skiing

Boys

Girls

Bobsleigh

Curling

Mixed team

Team
Amy Bryce
Callum Kinnear
Mili Smith
Ross Whyte

Round Robin

Draw 1

Draw 2

Draw 3

Draw 4

Draw 5

Draw 6

Draw 7

Quarterfinals

Mixed doubles

Freestyle skiing

Halfpipe

Ski cross

Slopestyle

Ice hockey

Luge

Individual sleds

Mixed team relay

Skeleton

See also
Great Britain at the 2016 Summer Olympics

References

2016 in British sport
Nations at the 2016 Winter Youth Olympics
Great Britain at the Youth Olympics